Szabolcs Törő (born 10 March 1983, in Ajka) is a Hungarian handballer who plays for SC Pick Szeged and the Hungarian national team.

The tricky winger participated on three European Championships (2006, 2008, 2010) and represented Hungary on further two World Championships (2009, 2011).

Achievements
Nemzeti Bajnokság I:
Winner: 2000
Silver Medalist: 2001, 2011
Bronze Medalist: 2002, 2006, 2007, 2008, 2009
Magyar Kupa:
Winner: 2001
Finalist: 2007, 2012
EHF Cup Winners' Cup:
Semifinalist: 2002

References

External links
 Szabolcs Törő player profile on SC Pick Szeged official website
 Szabolcs Törő career statistics at Worldhandball

1983 births
Living people
Hungarian male handball players
People from Ajka
Expatriate handball players
Hungarian expatriate sportspeople in Spain
Hungarian expatriate sportspeople in Germany
Sportspeople from Veszprém County